The 2005 Ugandan Super League was the 38th season of the official Ugandan football championship, the top-level football league of Uganda.

Overview
The 2005 Uganda Super League used a different format with 15 teams divided into 3 groups with 8 qualifying teams then progressing to the knock-out phase. The championship playoff was won by Police FC who defeated SC Villa 3-1 on penalties following a 0-0 draw in the final at Namboole Stadium. Those teams that failed to qualify for the knock-out phase entered a relegation pool but some teams failed to complete their league fixtures.

League standings

Group A

Group B

Group C

Championship playoff

Quarter-finals

First leg

Second leg

Semi-finals

First leg

Second leg

Final

Leading goalscorer
The top goalscorers in the 2005 season were Martin Muwanga (Police FC) and Geoffrey Sserunkuma (Kampala City Council FC) with 8 goals each.

Relegation pool
Kinyara Sugar Works FC and Kampala United finished top of the table and avoided relegation from the Super League. Mbarara United FC, Lugazi United, Kakira Sugar, Gulu United FC and Mityana UTODA were relegated, the latter two clubs having failed to fulfill their fixtures.

Footnotes

External links
 Uganda - List of Champions - RSSSF (Hans Schöggl)
 Ugandan Football League Tables - League321.com

Ugandan Super League seasons
1
Uganda
Uganda